Kamitsu Dam is a gravity dam located in Nara prefecture in Japan. The dam is used for agriculture and water supply. The catchment area of the dam is 18.9 km2. The dam impounds about 33  ha of land when full and can store 5600 thousand cubic meters of water. The construction of the dam was started on 1975 and completed in 2000.

References

Dams in Nara Prefecture
2000 establishments in Japan